Litueche (originally called El Rosario, Rosario Lo Solís or simply Rosario) is a Chilean town and commune in Cardenal Caro Province, O'Higgins Region.

It is served by Litueche Airport.

Demographics
Of these, 2,479 (44.9%) lived in urban areas and 3,047 (55.1%) in rural areas. The population grew by 1.1% (60 persons) between the 1992 and 2002 censuses.

Administration
As a commune, Litueche is a third-level administrative division of Chile administered by a municipal council, headed by an alcalde who is directly elected every four years. The 2021-2024 alcalde is René Acuña Echeverría.

References

External links
  Municipality of Litueche

Communes of Chile
Populated places in Cardenal Caro Province